The Greatest Hits is a compilation album of recordings by Amii Stewart released in 2005. The album is more or less a re-release of Hot Productions' 1996 compilation Knock On Wood - The Best Of Amii Stewart with a few changes. While this edition is digitally remastered it omits 1985 hit "Friends" and replaces it with the instrumental reprise of "Paradise Bird".

Track listing
"Knock on Wood" (Album version)  - 6:13
"You Really Touched My Heart"   - 4:29
"Light My Fire" / "137 Disco Heaven" (Album version) - 8:26
"Bring It On Back To Me"  - 3:56
"My Guy, My Girl" (1985 version feat. Deon Estus) - 4:31
"Get Your Love Back" - 3:56
"The Letter"   (Album version) - 6:58
"Paradise Bird" (Album version) - 6:35
"Jealousy" (Album version) - 6:09
"Right Place, Wrong Time"  - 5:07
"Step Into The Love Line" - 5:23
"Why'd You Have To Be So Sexy" (Extended version) - 5:20
"Where Did Our Love Go" (Album version)  - 4:26
"Paradise Found" (Instrumental) - 2:26

Personnel
 Amii Stewart - vocals
 Barry Leng  - backing vocals, guitar
 Charles Angins  - backing vocals
 Gerry Morris  - backing vocals
 Jimmy Chambers  - backing vocals
 Tony Jackson   - backing vocals
 Gerry Morris - bass guitar
 Adrian Shepard - drums
 Alan Murphy - guitar
 Ian Hughes - keyboards
 Ken Freeman - keyboards
 Pete Amesen - keyboards
 Simon May - keyboards
 Glyn Thomas - percussion

Production
 Producer - Barry Leng (tracks 1 to 11 & 14)
 Producer - Narada Michael Walden (tracks 12 & 13)
 Compilation producer - Paul Klein
 Mastered by - Rick Pantoja

Amii Stewart albums
albums produced by Narada Michael Walden
2005 greatest hits albums